George Sangster is a Dutch ornithologist.

He specialises in taxonomy and has written many articles on this subject for the magazines Dutch Birding, British Birds and other publications.

He is a member of the Dutch, British and European taxonomic committees.

References

1970 births
Living people
Dutch ornithologists
Academic staff of Stockholm University
Scientists from The Hague